John T. Galloway is a Democratic member of the Pennsylvania House of Representatives, representing the 140th state legislative district since 2007. His district includes parts of Bucks County.

Galloway is a 1977 graduate of Pennsbury High School and a 2001 graduate of the Project Management Institute. He attended Bucks County Community College. He previously served as a member of the Pennsbury School Board and was campaign manager for Bucks County Commissioner Sandra A. Miller.

He was first elected in 2007, defeating Republican Joseph Montone. Galloway serves as Secretary on the Aging & Older Adult Services Committee. He is a member of the Appropriations, Finance, Labor Relations, and Veterans Affairs & Emergency Preparedness committees.

References

External links
Pennsylvania House of Representatives - John T. Galloway – official PA House website
Pennsylvania House Democratic Caucus - Rep. John T. Galloway – official Party website

Democratic Party members of the Pennsylvania House of Representatives
1960 births
Living people
21st-century American politicians
Pennsbury High School alumni
Politicians from Bucks County, Pennsylvania